The White Bear is a Grade II listed public house at 57 St John Street, Clerkenwell, London.

It was built in 1899.

References

External links

Grade II listed pubs in London
Buildings and structures in Clerkenwell
Buildings and structures completed in 1899
19th-century architecture in the United Kingdom
Grade II listed buildings in the London Borough of Islington